Dinan-Léhon Football Club is a French football club based in the communes of Dinan and Léhon in the Bretagne region. The club currently plays in the Championnat National 3, the fifth division of French football, after achieving promotion from the Division d'Honneur in the 2009–10 season.

External links
 Official site

Association football clubs established in 1989
1989 establishments in France
Dinan
Sport in Côtes-d'Armor
Football clubs in Brittany